Karumallur is a village in Paravur Taluk, Ernakulam district in the Indian state of Kerala. Karumalloor is a panchayat in Ernakulam District. The village consists of large tracts of paddy fields. Karumallur is bounded by distributaries of the river Periyar. The panchayat is mainly a rice-based agrarian economy.

History
Karumallur was under Ayirur village union . The panchayat was formed in 1953. The village was famous for agricultural tools and even people from north come to buy these products.

Demographics
 India census, Karumalloor had a population of 26858 with 13189 males and 13669 females.

Educational Organizations
 Union Christian College, Aluva
 Holy Matha College, Manakkapady
 SNGIST, Thekkethazham
 Thantric Vidyapeedom
 The Alwaye Settlement H.S.School
 K.E.M.H.S., Kottapuram
 FMCT HS, Manakkapady
 MIUP School Veliyathunadu
 Govt LP School Manakkapady
 St Little Teresas UPS Thattanpady
 AIS UPS , MANJALY

Localities
U.C College, Veliyathunad, Parana, Aduvathuruth,
Karumallur, Mattupuram, Manjaly, Kallikuzhy, Manakkapady, Thattampady,  
Millupadi, Kaduvappadam, Mariyapady, Paruvakkad, Vayalodam, Chettikkad, Thekkethazham, Karukunnu, Kottapuram , puthukad , mandala , muriyaka

Ferrys
 Mambra - Wayalkara
 Mattupuram - Chowkakadav

Places of worship

 Purapillikavu Bhagavathy temple, Karumalloor
 Kanjirakaattu Bhagavathy temple, Karumalloor
 St.Joseph's Church, Manakkappady
 St.Thomas Church, Thattampady, Karumalloor
 W.Veliyathunadu Jum'a Masjid
Manjaly Juma Masjid, Manjaly
 E.Veliyathunadu Jum'a Masjid
 Kadoopadam Jum'a Masjid
 Badriya Masjid, Aduvathuruth
 Karipuram Sreekrishna temple
 Narayanamangalam Dharmashastha Temple
Attipuzhakkavu Temple
Mankuzhi Bhagavathy Temple
Ellumparambu Bhagavathy Temple
 Alangadu Jum'a Masjid
 Kaipetty Bhagavathy Temple, Karumalloor
 Alungal Bhagavathi Temple
 Puthukad jum'ah masjid

See also
North Paravur
Paravur Taluk
Ernakulam District
Kochi

References

Villages in Ernakulam district